The 'Cherokee County Schools manages the 13 schools in Cherokee County, North Carolina, United States, with an enrollment of 3,820 students and a 12.7:1 student-to-teacher ratio.

The School Superintendent is Dr. Keevn Woody.

Schools

Elementary schools
Andrews Elementary serves Pre-K through 4th grade. For 2021-22, the fifth grade will return to Andrews Elementary.
Marble Elementary school, located on Airport Road in Marble, North Carolina but is now closed as of 2017 and is now The Oaks Academy. It housed children in grades Pre-K thru 5th, and is a feeder school for Andrews Middle School.
Murphy Elementary School serves grades Pre-K-5 and has approximately 383 students.
Peachtree Elementary

Elementary-middle schools
Hiwassee Dam Elementary Middle School is a primary school offering grades K-8 located in Murphy, North Carolina.

Martins Creek Elementary-Middle School is a primary school with an enrollment of approximately 265 students from Pre-K through 8th grade. The 61-acre campus includes playgrounds, hiking trails, mountain biking trails and a multi-functional gymnasium.  The school has received numerous awards and distinctions including being in the top 25 Schools of Excellence in the North Carolina ABC program, a School of Distinction, a School of Exemplary Growth and was included in PC Magazine's Top 100 Wired Schools in the nation. It is also one of the few schools in the state to be recognized as achieving exemplary growth every year since the ABCs Program began 

Ranger Elementary Middle also offers grades K-8 in Murphy, North Carolina.

Middle schools
Andrews Middle School in Andrews, North Carolina serves grades 5-8 but the fifth will move back to Andrews Elementary and is one of only four middle schools in the Cherokee School District. As of 2007 it had an active enrollment of 255 students and a full-time teaching staff of 24 teachers giving an average of 11 students per teacher.

Murphy Middle School is a middle school located in Murphy, North Carolina. It serves grades 6-8, has approximately 350 students.

High schools
Andrews High School
Murphy High School
Hiwassee Dam High School
On May 28, 2020, the Cherokee County Board of Education voted to build one high school, expected to open by 2025 next to Tri-County Early College, an alternative middle/high school. The new school would replace Andrews High, Hiwassee Dam High School, and Murphy High. A $15 million grant from the state of North Carolina would help with the cost.

On September 21, 2022, the North Carolina Department of Public Instruction awarded Cherokee County Schools a $50 million grant for building a new high school facility from state-lottery funds. The funds reached $300 million and were shared among 9 county school districts.

Other schools
Mountain Youth Center

References

External links
 

School districts in North Carolina
Education in Cherokee County, North Carolina